The Brooklyn College Center for Computer Music (BC-CCM) located at Brooklyn College of the City University of New York (CUNY) was one of the first computer music centers at a public university in the United States. The BC-CCM is a community of artists and researchers that began in the 1970s.

The mission of the BC-CCM is to explore the creative possibilities of technology in relation to the creation of music, sound art, sound design, and multimedia arts.  Courses cover techniques of music composition with digital tools and instruments, theories and implementation of sound processing and sound synthesis, design and creation of new digital music and multimedia performance instruments, audio production, history and aesthetics of experimental music and sound art, and creative collaboration. The BC-CCM also sponsors residencies of visiting composers and media creators.

History 
The Brooklyn College Center for Computer Music began when composer Robert Starer, then a member of the faculty of the Conservatory of Music at Brooklyn College, proposed the idea of creating an electronic music studio at Brooklyn College in the mid-1970s.  The idea took root, and Jacob Druckman and Noah Creshevsky were the studio’s first Co-Directors. In those early days the equipment consisted largely of Moog analog synthesizers. Charles Dodge took over as Director in 1978, and he was responsible for having the studios designated as a center within Brooklyn College, the Center for Computer Music (CCM).

Charles Dodge was a pivotal figure in the history of the center. Dodge, originally from Iowa, had done a bachelor's degree at the University of Iowa and then earned his MA and doctorate (DMA) in Music Composition at Columbia University.  While at Columbia, Dodge was very active at the Columbia-Princeton Electronic Music Center.  In particular, Dodge was an innovator in the emerging field of computer music composition (as opposed to analog electronic composition, the norm in the field through the 1970s).  Dodge created some of the first meritorious works in the field of computer music, including Earth’s Magnetic Field (1970), which mapped magnetic field data to musical sounds, Speech Songs, a 1974 work that used analysis and resynthesis of human voices, and Any Resemblance is Purely Coincidental (1980), which combines live piano performance with a digitally-manipulated recording of Enrico Caruso singing the aria "Vesti la giubba".

During Dodge’s years as Professor of Composition and Director of the Brooklyn College Center for Computer Music (BC-CCM), Dodge had the CCM designated as a center within Brooklyn College in 1978, and brought it to a world-class standing in the field of computer music.  Dodge secured an initial donation of equipment from Bell Laboratories, and then proceeded to acquire large grants to fund BC-CCM work. The facilities received funding through grants from the United States Office of Education, the National Endowment for the Arts, the City University of New York Faculty Research and Award Program, and the Rockefeller Foundation, and through donations from private individuals.

Under Dodge’s leadership and with the efforts of numerous students, guests and artistic partners, the BC-CCM came to national prominence.  At that time the USA was leading the world in the field of computer music, and so this made the BC-CCM one of the world’s most highly regarded centers.  During these years, the BC-CCM presented summer workshops, which were attended by musicians from around the world, and hosted residencies for many composers of national and international stature, including John Cage, Lejaren Hiller, Laurie Spiegel, Larry Austin,  Robert Dick, Bob Ostertag, Morton Subotnick, Pauline Oliveros, Jon Appleton, Noah Creshevsky, Jean Claude Risset, and Lars Gunnar Bodin.

In the early 1990s after Charles Dodge stepped down as Director of the BC-CCM Noah Creshevsky assumed the directorship, with George Brunner as Technical Director.  It was at this time that the CCM began to host an International Electro-Acoustic Music Festival and concert series, offering performances of music, video, film, and live electronic works by artists from around the world.  When Noah Creshevsky retired in 2000, George Brunner took over as Acting Director until Amnon Wolman was named Director in 2003. Douglas Cohen served as Acting Director while Wolman was on an extended leave, and Douglas Geers joined the faculty as Director of the BC-CCM in fall of 2009.

References

External links 
 
 Online interview with Charles Dodge

Electronic music organizations
Information technology organizations based in North America
Experimental Music Studios